The 416th Theater Engineer Command (416th TEC) is a United States Army Reserve command that conducts theater-level engineer operations for US Army Central Command, US Army Southern Command, supports continental U.S. – based engineer requirements as directed, and is prepared to participate in Joint and Combined regional contingency operations.  It is also the higher command headquarters for the US Army Facility Engineer Group.

History
The 416th Engineer Command provides theater-level engineer support to the Combatant Commander in the event of a contingency operation. It is designed to command hundreds of engineer units and thousands of Soldiers in a war fighting capacity. The Command has historical training relationships in South and Central America, Southwest Asia, and provides direct support to the US Army Central Command.  Until mobilized, the 416th ENCOM is under operational control of the Headquarters, U.S. Army Corps of Engineers.

As an operational command, the 416th has brigades and other assigned units with approximately 10,000 Soldiers located throughout the United States.

The command was formed in 1950, and has served in both Iraq during the Gulf War, and Afghanistan during Operation Enduring Freedom. 416th Soldiers have assisted with construction missions and supported joint exercises in the Honduras and Costa Rica.

The 416th has deployed numerous detachments from the US Army Facility Engineer Group since the beginning of the Global War on Terror.

Current Structure
As of September 2020, the command is currently composed of the following:

 416th Engineer Command, in Darien, Illinois
 USACE Contingency Response Unit, in Washington, District of Columbia
 113th Engineer Detachment, in Saint Charles, Missouri
 208th Engineer Detachment (Digital Liaison), in Colorado Springs, Colorado
 213th Engineer Detachment, in Camp Parks, California
 301st Engineer Detachment (Forward Engineer Support Main Team), in Denver, Colorado
 378th Engineer Detachment (Forward Engineer Support Main Team), in Darien, Illinois
 372nd Engineer Brigade, at Fort Snelling, Minnesota
 367th Engineer Battalion, in Saint Cloud, Minnesota
 389th Engineer Battalion, in Dubuque, Iowa
 863rd Engineer Battalion, in Darien, Illinois
 983rd Engineer Battalion, in Monclova, Ohio
 420th Engineer Brigade, in Bryan, Texas
 489th Engineer Battalion, in North Little Rock, Arkansas
 961st Engineer Battalion, in Seagoville, Texas
 980th Engineer Battalion, in Austin, Texas
 301st Maneuver Enhancement Brigade, at Joint Base Lewis–McChord
 315th Engineer Battalion, at Camp Pendleton, California
 321st Engineer Battalion, in Boise, Idaho
 397th Engineer Battalion, in Marina, California
 476th Chemical Battalion, at Joint Base Lewis–McChord, Washington

References

416
416
416